The Western Wayne Athletic Conference (WWAC), is a high school sports conference located in Wayne County, Michigan. It was formed in 2009.

Formation and Expansion
The WWAC was formed by 11 of the teams of the former Michigan Mega Conference after it disbanded in 2009. The league began play that same year. The league expanded in 2013 with the additions of Clarenceville, and until summer 2013, Inkster. Many rivalries from the Mega were carried over to the WWAC, including the rivalries from Dearborn and Dearborn Heights. Annual crossover games had also maintained the football rivalry between Garden City and Edsel Ford, until 2015, when division realignment forced the teams to put the game on hiatus.

In 2018, Belleville, Dearborn and Fordson all left the WWAC to join the Kensington Lakes Activities Association, while Edsel Ford left the same year in favor of joining the Downriver League. These losses forced the WWAC to get rid of the Red and Blue divisions and have all the remaining WWAC members play under the same division. The next year, in 2019, Clarenceville left the WWAC in favor of joining the Michigan Independent Athletic Conference, and in exchange, Melvindale High was brought on from the Downriver League.

Member schools

Current members

Former members

*Inkster joined the WWAC during the 2012–13 school year and played spring sports. However, before Inkster could start their first full season in the WWAC, their school district closed. This resulted in the high school closing which gave Inkster no choice but to withdraw from the conference.

Membership Timeline with Football Divisions

Sports Supported

The WWAC supports Football, Basketball, Golf, Swimming, Cross-Country, Track, Soccer, Wrestling, Baseball, Softball, Tennis, Volleyball, and Bowling.

Athletic History 

2009 establishments in Michigan
Michigan high school sports conferences
Wayne County, Michigan